Mahiri was a  Empire F type coaster that was built in 1944 by Henry Scarr Ltd, Hessle, United Kingdom as Empire Farringdon for the Ministry of War Transport (MoWT). She was sold in 1946 and renamed Susie Olivier. A further sale in 1948 saw her renamed Mahiri. She served until 1974 when she sprang a leak and foundered.

Description
The ship was an Empire F type coaster built in 1944 by Henry Scarr Ltd, Hessle, United Kingdom.

The ship was propelled by a four-stroke Single Cycle, Single Action diesel engine, which had six cylinders of 8½ inches (22 cm) diameter by 13¾ inches (35 cm) stroke driving a screw propeller. The engine was built by Mirrlees, Bickerton & Day Ltd, Stockport, Cheshire. It was rated at 42 nhp.

History
Empire Farringdon was built by Henry Scarr Ltd, Hessle, United Kingdom. Laid down as CHANT 18 then renamed Fabric 18 whilst under construction, she was launched as Empire Farringdon in August 1944 and completed in September 1944. Built for the MOWT, she was placed under the management of the Great Yarmouth Shipping Co Ltd. The United Kingdom Official Number 180293 and Code Letters MLLZ were allocated. Her port of registry was Hull.

In 1946, Empire Farringdon was sold to De Malglaive Shipping Ltd, Windsor, Berkshire and renamed Susie Olivier. She was sold in 1948 to Booker Brothers, McConnell & Co Ltd and was renamed Mahiri. A new diesel engine was fitted in 1962. In 1972, management of the vessel was placed with the Island Shipping Co, Trinidad. She was taken in tow but capsized and sank in the Gulf of Paria.

References

1944 ships
Ships built on the Humber
Empire ships
Ministry of War Transport ships
Merchant ships of the United Kingdom
Maritime incidents in 1974